Hyaluronic acid (abbreviated HA; conjugate base hyaluronate), also called hyaluronan, is an anionic, nonsulfated glycosaminoglycan distributed widely throughout connective, epithelial, and neural tissues. It is unique among glycosaminoglycans as it is non-sulfated, forms in the plasma membrane instead of the Golgi apparatus, and can be very large: human synovial HA averages about 7 million Da per molecule, or about 20,000 disaccharide monomers, while other sources mention 3–4 million Da.

The average 70 kg (150 lb) person has roughly 15 grams of hyaluronan in the body, one-third of which is turned over (i.e., degraded and synthesized) per day.  

As one of the chief components of the extracellular matrix, it contributes significantly to cell proliferation and migration, and is involved in the progression of many malignant tumors. Hyaluronic acid is also a component of the group A streptococcal extracellular capsule, and is believed to play a role in virulence.

Physiological function 
Until the late 1970s, hyaluronic acid was described as a "goo" molecule, a ubiquitous carbohydrate polymer that is part of the extracellular matrix.  For example, hyaluronic acid is a major component of the synovial fluid and was found to increase the viscosity of the fluid. Along with lubricin, it is one of the fluid's main lubricating components.

Hyaluronic acid is an important component of articular cartilage, where it is present as a coat around each cell (chondrocyte). When aggrecan monomers bind to hyaluronan in the presence of HAPLN1 (hyaluronic acid and proteoglycan link protein 1), large, highly negatively charged aggregates form.  These aggregates imbibe water and are responsible for the resilience of cartilage (its resistance to compression). The molecular weight (size) of hyaluronan in cartilage decreases with age, but the amount increases.

A lubricating role of hyaluronan in muscular connective tissues to enhance the sliding between adjacent tissue layers has been suggested. A particular type of fibroblasts, embedded in dense fascial tissues, has been proposed as being cells specialized for the biosynthesis of the hyaluronan-rich matrix. Their related activity could be involved in regulating the sliding ability between adjacent muscular connective tissues.

Hyaluronic acid is also a major component of skin, where it is involved in repairing tissue. When skin is exposed to excessive UVB rays, it becomes inflamed (sunburn), and the cells in the dermis stop producing as much hyaluronan and increase the rate of its degradation. Hyaluronan degradation products then accumulate in the skin after UV exposure.

While it is abundant in extracellular matrices, hyaluronan also contributes to tissue hydrodynamics, movement, and proliferation of cells and participates in a number of cell surface receptor interactions, notably those including its primary receptors, CD44 and RHAMM. Upregulation of CD44 itself is widely accepted as a marker of cell activation in lymphocytes. Hyaluronan's contribution to tumor growth may be due to its interaction with CD44. Receptor CD44 participates in cell adhesion interactions required by tumor cells.

Although hyaluronan binds to receptor CD44, there is evidence hyaluronan degradation products transduce their inflammatory signal through toll-like receptor 2 (TLR2), TLR4, or both TLR2 and TLR4 in macrophages and dendritic cells. TLR and hyaluronan play a role in innate immunity.

There are limitations including the in vivo loss of this compound limiting the duration of effect.

Wound repair 
As a major component of the extracellular matrix, hyaluronic acid has a key role in tissue regeneration, inflammation response, and angiogenesis, which are phases of wound repair. As of 2016, however, reviews of its effect on wound healing in burns, diabetic foot ulcers or surgical skin repairs show only limited positive clinical research evidence. Hyaluronic acid combines with water and swells to form a gel, making it useful in skin treatments as a dermal filler for facial wrinkles; its effect lasts for about 6 to 12 months, and treatment has regulatory approval from the US Food and Drug Administration.

Granulation 
Granulation tissue is the perfused, fibrous connective tissue that replaces a fibrin clot in healing wounds. It typically grows from the base of a wound and is able to fill wounds of almost any size it heals. HA is abundant in granulation tissue matrix. A variety of cell functions that are essential for tissue repair may attribute to this HA-rich network. These functions include facilitation of cell migration into the provisional wound matrix, cell proliferation, and organization of the granulation tissue matrix. Initiation of inflammation is crucial for the formation of granulation tissue; therefore, the pro-inflammatory role of HA as discussed above also contributes to this stage of wound healing.

Cell migration 
Cell migration is essential for the formation of granulation tissue. The early stage of granulation tissue is dominated by a HA-rich extracellular matrix, which is regarded as a conducive environment for the migration of cells into this temporary wound matrix. HA provides an open hydrated matrix that facilitates cell migration, whereas, in the latter scenario, directed migration and control of related cell mechanisms are mediated via the specific cell interaction between HA and cell surface HA receptors. It forms links with several protein kinases associated with cell locomotion, for example, extracellular signal-regulated kinase, focal adhesion kinase, and other non-receptor tyrosine kinases. During fetal development, the migration path through which neural crest cells migrate is rich in HA. HA is closely associated with the cell migration process in granulation tissue matrix, and studies show that cell movement can be inhibited, at least partially, by HA degradation or blocking HA receptor occupancy.

By providing the dynamic force to the cell, HA synthesis has also been shown to associate with cell migration. Basically, HA is synthesized at the plasma membrane and released directly into the extracellular environment. This may contribute to the hydrated microenvironment at sites of synthesis, and is essential for cell migration by facilitating cell detachment.

Skin healing 
HA plays an important role in the normal epidermis. HA also has crucial functions in the reepithelization process due to several of its properties. These include being an integral part of the extracellular matrix of basal keratinocytes, which are major constituents of the epidermis; its free-radical scavenging function, and its role in keratinocyte proliferation and migration.

In normal skin, HA is found in relatively high concentrations in the basal layer of the epidermis where proliferating keratinocytes are found. CD44 is collocated with HA in the basal layer of epidermis where additionally it has been shown to be preferentially expressed on plasma membrane facing the HA-rich matrix pouches. Maintaining the extracellular space and providing an open, as well as hydrated, structure for the passage of nutrients are the main functions of HA in epidermis. A report found HA content increases in the presence of retinoic acid (vitamin A). The proposed effects of retinoic acid against skin photo-damage and photoaging may be correlated, at least in part, with an increase of skin HA content, giving rise to increased tissue hydration. It has been suggested that the free-radical scavenging property of HA contributes to protection against solar radiation, supporting the role of CD44 acting as a HA receptor in the epidermis.

Epidermal HA also functions as a manipulator in the process of keratinocyte proliferation, which is essential in normal epidermal function, as well as during reepithelization in tissue repair. In the wound healing process, HA is expressed in the wound margin, in the connective tissue matrix, and collocating with CD44 expression in migrating keratinocytes.

Medical uses

Hyaluronic acid has been FDA-approved to treat osteoarthritis of the knee via intra-articular injection. A 2012 review showed that the quality of studies supporting this use was mostly poor, with a general absence of significant benefits, and that intra-articular injection of HA could possibly cause adverse effects. A 2020 meta-analysis found that intra-articular injection of high molecular weight HA improved both pain and function in people with knee osteoarthritis.

Hyaluronic acid has been used in various formulations to create artificial tears to treat dry eye.

Hyaluronic acid is a common ingredient in skin care products. Hyaluronic acid is used as a dermal filler in cosmetic surgery. It is typically injected using either a classic sharp hypodermic needle or a micro-cannula. Some studies have suggested that the use of micro-cannulas can significantly reduce vessel embolisms during injections. Currently, hyaluronic acid is used frequently as a soft tissue filler due to its bio-compatibility and possible reversibility using Hyaluronidase Complications include the severing of nerves and microvessels, pain, and bruising. Some side effects can also appear by way of erythema, itching, and vascular occlusion; vascular occlusion is the most worrisome side effect due to the possibility of skin necrosis, or even blindness in a patient. In some cases, hyaluronic acid fillers can result in a granulomatous foreign body reaction.

Sources

Hyaluronic acid is produced on a large scale by extraction from animal tissues, such as chicken comb, and from Streptococci.

Structure 
Hyaluronic acid is a polymer of disaccharides, which are composed of D-glucuronic acid and N-acetyl-D-glucosamine, linked via alternating β-(1→4) and β-(1→3) glycosidic bonds. Hyaluronic acid can be 25,000 disaccharide repeats in length. Polymers of hyaluronic acid can range in size from 5,000 to 20,000,000 Da in vivo. The average molecular weight in human synovial fluid is 3–4 million Da, and hyaluronic acid purified from human umbilical cord is 3,140,000 Da; other sources mention average molecular weight of 7 million Da for synovial fluid. Hyaluronic acid also contains silicon, ranging 350–1,900μg/g depending on location in the organism.

Hyaluronic acid is energetically stable, in part because of the stereochemistry of its component disaccharides. Bulky groups on each sugar molecule are in sterically favored positions, whereas the smaller hydrogens assume the less-favorable axial positions.

Hyaluronic acid in aqueous solutions self-associates to form transient clusters in solution. While it is considered a polyelectrolyte polymer chain, hyaluronic acid does not exhibit the polyelectrolyte peak, suggesting the absence of a characteristic length scale between the hyaluronic acid molecules and the emergence of a fractal clustering, which is due to the strong solvation of these molecules.

Biological synthesis 
Hyaluronic acid is synthesized by a class of integral membrane proteins called hyaluronan synthases, of which vertebrates have three types: HAS1, HAS2, and HAS3. These enzymes lengthen hyaluronan by repeatedly adding D-glucuronic acid and N-acetyl-D-glucosamine to the nascent polysaccharide as it is extruded via ABC-transporter through the cell membrane into the extracellular space. The term fasciacyte was coined to describe fibroblast-like cells that synthesize HA.

Hyaluronic acid synthesis has been shown to be inhibited by 4-methylumbelliferone (hymecromone), a 7-hydroxy-4-methylcoumarin derivative.
This selective inhibition (without inhibiting other glycosaminoglycans) may prove useful in preventing metastasis of malignant tumor cells. There is feedback inhibition of hyaluronan synthesis by low-molecular-weight hyaluronan (<500 kDa) at high concentrations, but stimulation by high-molecular-weight hyaluronan (>500 kDa), when tested in cultured human synovial fibroblasts.

Bacillus subtilis recently has been genetically modified to culture a proprietary formula to yield hyaluronans, in a patented process producing human-grade product.

Fasciacyte 
A fasciacyte is a type of biological cell that produces hyaluronan-rich extracellular matrix and modulates the gliding of muscle fasciae.

Fasciacytes are fibroblast-like cells found in fasciae. They are round-shaped with rounder nuclei and have less elongated cellular processes when compared with fibroblasts. Fasciacytes are clustered along the upper and lower surfaces of a fascial layer.

Fasciacytes produce hyaluronan, which regulates fascial gliding.

Biosynthetic mechanism 
Hyaluronic acid (HA) is a linear glycosaminoglycan (GAG), an anionic, gel-like, polymer, found in the extracellular matrix of epithelial and connective tissues of vertebrates. It is part of a family of structurally complex, linear, anionic polysaccharides. The carboxylate groups present in the molecule make it negatively charged, therefore allowing for successful binding to water, and making it valuable to cosmetic and pharmaceutical products.

HA consists of repeating β4-glucuronic acid (GlcUA)-β3-N-acetylglucosamine (GlcNAc) disaccharides, and is synthesized by hyaluronan synthases (HAS), a class of integral membrane proteins that produce the well-defined, uniform chain lengths characteristic to HA. There are three existing types of HASs in vertebrates: HAS1, HAS2, HAS3; each of these contribute to elongation of the HA polymer. For an HA capsule to be created, this enzyme must be present because it polymerizes UDP-sugar precursors into HA. HA precursors are synthesized by first phosphorylating glucose by hexokinase, yielding glucose-6-phosphate, which is the main HA precursor. Then, two routes are taken to synthesize UDP-n-acetylglucosamine and UDP-glucuronic acid which both react to form HA. Glucose-6-phosphate gets converted to either fructose-6-phosphate with hasE (phosphoglucoisomerase), or glucose-1-phosphate using pgm (α -phosphoglucomutase), where those both undergo different sets of reactions.

UDP-glucuronic acid and UDP-n-acetylglucosamine get bound together to form HA via hasA (HA synthase).

Synthesis of UDP-glucuronic acid 
UDP-glucuronic acid is formed from hasC (UDP-glucose pyrophosphorylase) converting glucose-1-P into UDP-glucose, which then reacts with hasB (UDP-glucose dehydrogenase) to form UDP-glucuronic acid.

Synthesis of N-acetyl glucosamine 
The path forward from fructose-6-P utilizes glmS (amidotransferase) to form glucosamine-6-P. Then, glmM (Mutase) reacts with this product to form glucosamine-1-P. hasD (acetyltransferase) converts this into n-acetylglucosamine-1-P, and finally, hasD (pyrophosphorylase) converts this product into UDP-n-acetylglucosamine.

Final step: Two disaccharides form hyaluronic acid 
UDP-glucuronic acid and UDP-n-acetylglucosamine get bound together to form HA via hasA (HA synthase), completing the synthesis.

Degradation 
Hyaluronic acid can be degraded by a family of enzymes called hyaluronidases. In humans, there are at least seven types of hyaluronidase-like enzymes, several of which are tumor suppressors. The degradation products of hyaluronan, the oligosaccharides and very low-molecular-weight hyaluronan, exhibit pro-angiogenic properties. In addition, recent studies showed hyaluronan fragments, not the native high-molecular weight molecule, can induce inflammatory responses in macrophages and dendritic cells in tissue injury and in skin transplant.

Hyaluronan can also be degraded via non-enzymatic reactions. These include acidic and alkaline hydrolysis, ultrasonic disintegration, thermal decomposition, and degradation by oxidants.

Etymology 
Hyaluronic acid is derived from hyalos (Greek for vitreous, meaning ‘glass-like’) and uronic acid because it was first isolated from the vitreous humour and possesses a high uronic acid content. The term hyaluronate refers to the conjugate base of hyaluronic acid. Since the molecule typically exists in vivo in its polyanionic form, it is most commonly referred to as hyaluronan.

History 
Hyaluronic acid was first obtained by Karl Meyer and John Palmer in 1934 from the vitreous body in a cow's eye. The first hyaluronan biomedical product, Healon, was developed in the 1970s and 1980s by Pharmacia, and approved for use in eye surgery (i.e., corneal transplantation, cataract surgery, glaucoma surgery, and surgery to repair retinal detachment). Other biomedical companies also produce brands of hyaluronan for ophthalmic surgery.

Native hyaluronic acid has a relatively short half-life (shown in rabbits) so various manufacturing techniques have been deployed to extend the length of the chain and stabilise the molecule for its use in medical applications. The introduction of protein-based cross-links, the introduction of free-radical scavenging molecules such as sorbitol, and minimal stabilisation of the HA chains through chemical agents such as NASHA (non-animal stabilised hyaluronic acid) are all techniques that have been used to preserve its shelf life.

In the late 1970s, intraocular lens implantation was often followed by severe corneal edema, due to endothelial cell damage during the surgery. It was evident that a viscous, clear, physiologic lubricant to prevent such scraping of the endothelial cells was needed.

The name "hyaluronan" is also used for a salt.

Other animals 
Hyaluronan is used in treatment of articular disorders in horses, in particular those in competition or heavy work. It is indicated for carpal and fetlock joint dysfunctions, but not when joint sepsis or fracture are suspected. It is especially used for synovitis associated with equine osteoarthritis. It can be injected directly into an affected joint, or intravenously for less localized disorders. It may cause mild heating of the joint if directly injected, but this does not affect the clinical outcome. Intra-articularly administered medicine is fully metabolized in less than a week.

Note that, according to Canadian regulation, hyaluronan in HY-50 preparation should not be administered to animals to be slaughtered for horse meat. In Europe, however, the same preparation is not considered to have any such effect, and edibility of the horse meat is not affected.

Naked mole rats have very high molecular weight hyaluronan (6–12 MDa) that has been shown to give them resistance to cancer. This large HA is due to both differently sequenced HAS2 and lower HA degradation mechanisms.

Research 
Due to its high biocompatibility and its common presence in the extracellular matrix of tissues, hyaluronan is gaining popularity as a biomaterial scaffold in tissue engineering research. In particular, research groups have found hyaluronan's properties for tissue engineering and regenerative medicine are significantly improved with cross-linking, producing a hydrogel. Crosslinking may allow a desired shape, as well as to deliver therapeutic molecules into a host. Hyaluronan can be crosslinked by attaching thiols (see thiomers)(trade names: Extracel, HyStem), methacrylates, hexadecylamides (trade name: Hymovis), and tyramines (trade name: Corgel). Hyaluronan can also be crosslinked directly with formaldehyde (trade name: Hylan-A) or with divinylsulfone (trade name: Hylan-B).

Due to its ability to regulate angiogenesis by stimulating endothelial cells to proliferate, hyaluronan can be used to create hydrogels to study vascular morphogenesis. These hydrogels have properties similar to human soft tissue, but are also easily controlled and modified, making HA very suitable for tissue-engineering studies. For example, HA hydrogels are appealing for engineering vasculature from endothelial progenitor cells by using appropriate growth factors such as VEGF and Ang-1 to promote proliferation and vascular network formation. Vacuole and lumen formation have been observed in these gels, followed by branching and sprouting through degradation of the hydrogel and finally complex network formation. The ability to generate vascular networks using HA hydrogels leads to opportunities for in vivo and clinical applications. One in vivo study, where HA hydrogels with endothelial colony forming cells were implanted into mice three days after hydrogel formation, saw evidence that the host and engineered vessels joined within 2 weeks of implantation, indicating viability and functionality of the engineered vasculature.

See also 
 Alguronic acid
 Sodium hyaluronate

References

External links 
 

Acids
Glycosaminoglycans
Veterinary drugs
Sanofi